Tricia Farley-Bouvier is an American state legislator serving in the Massachusetts House of Representatives, representing the 3rd Berkshire district, serving Pittsfield's ward 1-A, 2, 3, 4, 5, 6, and 7. She serves as Vice Chair of House Committee on Steering, Policy and Scheduling, and also sits on the Joint Committee on Consumer Protection and Professional Licensure, the Joint Committee on Tourism, Arts, and Cultural Development, and the Special Joint Committee on Redistricting.

Early life and education
Farley-Bouvier is a Pittsfield native, attending Pittsfield High School before receiving a bachelor's degree in special and elementary education from Salve Regina University and a master's degree in education from the University of Connecticut.

Career
Farley-Bouvier served as a Pittsfield City Councilor from 2004 to 2008, was elected in a special election to the Massachusetts House of Representatives in 2011, and won reelection in 2012, 2014, 2016, 2018, and 2020.

See also
 2019–2020 Massachusetts legislature
 2021–2022 Massachusetts legislature

References

External links
Tricia Farley-Bouvier. Massachusetts General Court.

Year of birth missing (living people)
Living people
Politicians from Pittsfield, Massachusetts
Salve Regina University alumni
University of Connecticut alumni
Massachusetts city council members
Democratic Party members of the Massachusetts House of Representatives
Women state legislators in Massachusetts
21st-century American politicians
21st-century American women politicians
Women city councillors in Massachusetts